Battle of the Supercars was a weekly motorsports television show. Hosted by Lee Reherman, it featured professional race drivers Tanner Foust and  Paul Tracy putting supercars in head to head competition with one another.

Episode list

External links
Speed Channel page

Automotive television series